Laure Prouvost (born 1978) is a French artist living and working in Antwerp, Belgium. She won the 2013 Turner Prize. In 2019, she represented France at the Venice Biennale with the multi-media work "The Deep Blue Sea Surrounding You".

Career
Prouvost was born in Croix, an upscale suburb of Lille, France, and attended a local school with a strong arts focus. She studied film  at Central Saint Martins and also attended Goldsmiths, University of London. After graduating from Saint Martins, she worked as an assistant to the artist John Latham, who she describes as "more like a grandfather than my real grandfather". She has exhibited at Tate Britain and the Institute of Contemporary Arts. She was awarded the biennial MaxMara Art Prize for Women in 2011, in collaboration with the Whitechapel Gallery and her work has appeared in the private contemporary art collection Collezione Maramotti in Reggio Emilia, Italy. Prouvost's work combines installation, collage and film.

Prouvost was the principal prize winner at the 57th Oberhausen Film Festival In 2014, she staged her first solo museum exhibition in the United States at the New Museum,  titled For Forgetting.

2013 Turner Prize
Prouvost won the 2013, Turner Prize winner for an installation named Wantee made in response to the artist Kurt Schwitters. In a tea party setting a film describes a fictional relationship between Prouvost's grandfather and Schwitters. The work is named in reference to the habit of Schwitters' partner of asking guests if they "want tea". The panel described the work as "outstanding for its complex and courageous combination of images and objects in a deeply atmospheric environment". Prouvost was generally considered a surprise winner.

In 2018, she created an installation for the Palais de Tokyo in Paris titled Ring Sing and drink for Trespassing.

In 2021, she presented a video installation titled ‘They Parlaient Idéale ’ as part of a group exhibition titled ‘Fire In My Belly’ at Julia Stoschek Collection in Berlin. The film reflects on what it means to be a citizen of a nation, especially when one's identity is rather ambiguous, by documenting a cross-generational and interracial cast of performers embarking on a road trip from Grigny, a suburb of Paris, to the French pavilion at the Venice Biennial.

Selected works
 2007 : Owt, video
 2010 : I need to take care of my conceptual Grand dad, video
 2010 : The Artist, video
 2010 : It Heat Hit, video
 2011 : The Wanderer, video
 2012 : Why does Gregor never rings, video installation
 2013 : Farfromwords: car mirrors eat raspberries when swimming through the sun, to swallow sweet smells, video installation
 2013 : Wantee, video installation
2016:  We would be floating away from the dirty past, video installation
 2016 : Lick in the Past, video
 2017 : Dit Learn, video

References

Further reading

External links

www.laureprouvost.com

1978 births
Living people
People from Croix, Nord
Alumni of Central Saint Martins
Alumni of Goldsmiths, University of London
French contemporary artists
French expatriates in the United Kingdom
Turner Prize winners
French women artists